The Torra di Fornali is a Genoese tower in Corsica, located in the commune of Saint-Florent.

The tower was fought over during the Siege of Saint-Florent in 1794.

Notes and references

Towers in Corsica